American Heritage may refer to:

 American Heritage (magazine)
 The American Heritage Dictionary of the English Language
 American Heritage Rivers
 American Heritage School (disambiguation)

See also
National Register of Historic Places in the US
World Heritage Site
American Heritage Girls